The sculptural composition "Egyptian Pyramid" (Russian: Скульптурная композиция «Египетская пирамида») is a sculptural composition in Taganrog created by sculptor Dmitry Lyndin based on the story of Anton Chekhov "Kashtanka".

Description 
The sculptural composition is executed in technology of bronze casting in a form.  It is an episode of the Chekhov story "Kashtanka" – circus number "Egyptian pyramid": pig Havronya Ivanovna, goose Ivan Ivanovich, cat Fedor Timofeevich and Kashtanka. The composition is made of bronze. It is installed on a low granite pedestal around which is laid a colored tile symbolizing the circus arena. Sculptural composition is created taking into account the maximum safety for children's games, which is promoted by her dimensions and the plastic decision.

It is established on the platform before an entrance to Gorky Park.

150 kg of wax (wax model), 1000 kg of molding mixture, 1000 kg of bronze art "Br OCS 555" were used to make the composition. The figures of composition cast in bronze were subjected to engraving, grinding, polishing and artificial patination. The total cost of manufacturing, installation and improvement of sculptural composition amounted to 1 061,0 thousand rubles.

History 
The opening of the monument took place on the Day of Knowledge, September 1, 2008. The author of the work is Rostov sculptor Dmitry Lyndin.

Trivia 
Citizens of Taganrog showed so great interest to Dmitry Lyndin's work that the Mayor of Taganrog Nikolay Fedyanin personally came to the masterful sculptor, to look how work moves on the project which won a competition.

Among the Taganrog people was born a tradition "to fulfill the desires" to rub a pig's piglet and to toss it into the litter of its slightly open jaws. A little later the young vandals "finished" a pig's piglet, squandering it with the purpose of extracting coins with the help of various devices made of wire.

References 

Tourist attractions in Taganrog
Monuments and memorials in Taganrog